Neozodes signatus is a species of beetle in the family Cerambycidae, the only species in the genus Neozodes.

References

Rhopalophorini
Monotypic beetle genera